The Great Mosque of Sumenep (Indonesian Masjid Agung Sumenep) is an 18th-century mosque in Sumenep, Madura. Standing on the alun-alun of Sumenep, it is the largest mosque in Madura Island and a noted landmark of Madura.

History
Previously known as the Panembahan Somala Jami Mosque after the 31st adipati ("duke") of Sumenep who established the mosque, construction of the mosque started in 1779 and was completed in 1787. The mosque was built as part of the kraton complex of Sumenep. 

The Great Mosque of Sumenep is the second mosque of the new kraton complex, replacing the earlier mosque masjid laju (Madurese "old mosque"), whose construction was initiated by Kanjeng R. Tumenggung Ario Anggadipa, 21st ruler of Sumenep, and was completed in 1757.

Architecture
The architect of the mosque is Lauw Pia Ngo, one of the early generation of Chinese people who took residence in Madura. He also designed the Sumenep kraton, which was completed earlier in 1764.

The overall impression of the mosque is of eclectic influence, a mixture of Chinese, local Javanese, and western style; typical of the cities on the north of Java. The Great Mosque of Sumenep features a three-tiered roof, a typical style in the mosque architecture of Indonesia. This main roof is topped with a kemuncak decoration, featuring three spheres. This main roof is surrounded by six sets of smaller two-tiered roofs to the south, east, and north of the main prayer hall. A white brick wall enclosed the interior space of the mosque. The tall windows and main door, reminiscent of Dutch colonial architecture style, are painted in bold color instead, a characteristic Chinese style. 

The mosque complex is surrounded by iron fence, although in the past this was massive wall instead, completely separating the enclosed inner space of the mosque complex with the outside world. To the southeast and northeast of the perimeter are two small pavilions with rounded cupola, flanking the eastern perimeter of the mosque complex. These small pavilions were used as prisons. 

The most distinctive feature of the mosque is its main gateway. It features an eclectic design, mixture of Chinese and Javanese influence. The main gate is topped with a platform on its first floor, this can be accessed via two flight of staircases on the left and right of the main gate. A bedug is hanged in the space above the gateway's portal. This bedug originally belongs to masjid laju.

See also

List of mosques in Indonesia

References

Works cited

Religious buildings and structures completed in 1787
Mosques in Indonesia
18th-century mosques
Madura Island